Alan Alfredo López Rosales (born 21 June 1990 in Guadalajara, Jalisco), known as Alan López, is a former Mexican professional association football (soccer) player who last played for Venados on loan from Atlas.

He played with the Jaguares de Jalisco of the Liga de Balompié Mexicano, leading them to a runner-up finish in the 2021 season.

References

External links
 
 

Living people
1990 births
Footballers from Guadalajara, Jalisco
Atlas F.C. footballers
Liga MX players
Mexican footballers
Ascenso MX players
Liga de Balompié Mexicano players
Association football goalkeepers
Venados F.C. players